Ambikapur is a city and headquarters of Surguja district in the Indian state of Chhattisgarh. It is one of the oldest cities in the state, in east-central India. Ambikapur is also the divisional headquarters of Surguja Division which consists of the six districts of Surguja, Korea, Manendragarh, Balrampur, Surajpur and Jashpur.

Ambikapur was the capital of the Princely state of Surguja before Indian Independence The name of the city is derived from the Hindu goddess Ambika (Mahamaya) Devi, who is the central figure of worship in the area. The area under Ambikapur Municipal Corporation is 35.360 sq km.

According to Swachh Survekshan 2019, Ambikapur was the second Cleanest cities of India. As of Swachh Survekshan 2020, Ambikapur is the cleanest city of Chhattisgarh as well as the cleanest city in India amongst cities with a population of 1 to 10 lakhs.

Geography 
It has an average elevation of 623 metres (2078 feet). The district is spread over a forest-rich area of 22,237 km². Most of the district's terrain is forested and hilly. Natural resources include bauxite, forest products and paddy crops.

Climate

Land 
The land is classified into six categories. About 41.67% is under agriculture, while about 5.70% remains fallow. A further 11.44% of the land could be brought under cultivation by improvements in farming techniques and reclamation of marginal areas . A further 1.27% is barren and uncultivated while 33.09% is forest cover and 6.83% is covered by buildings, roads and other infrastructure.

This distribution of cultivated land reflects the patterns and intensity of early agricultural practices and the extent of the population, combined with physical factors. Areas with a high concentration of cultivated land are generally those with longer histories of settlement and agricultural use.

Demographics

 2011 census, Ambikapur municipal corporation had a population of 264,575 and the urban agglomeration had a population of 343,173. The municipality had a sex ratio of 920 females per 1,000 males and 11.3% of the population was under six years old. Effective literacy was 88.20%; male literacy was 92.73% and female literacy was 83.29%.

Ambikapur is inhabited by people from across India. Moderate weather makes it an attractive place for settlement. Unlike the capital, the district population comprises aboriginal populations including the Pandos and Korwas, who still live in rural areas.

Mainpat near Ambikapur is home to a significant number of Tibetan migrants who took refuge in India after the Chinese annexation of Tibet in 1959.

Government and politics 
The city is part of the Sarguja Lok Sabha constituency represented by Member of Parliament Renuka Singh from the BJP, and in the state assembly through the Ambikapur Assembly constituency, represented by MLA T.S. Deo from the Indian National Congress.

Civic administration 
The city is governed by the Municipal Corporation of Ambikapur or Nagar Nigam Ambikapur, which is administered under the Chhattisgarh Municipal Corporation Act,1956. The municipal corporation has two parts, elected body and administrative body. The elected body is headed by the Mayor Ajay Tirkey from the Indian National Congress. The last election to Ambikapur Municipal Corporation took place in 2019. The administrative body is headed by the Municipal commissioner Mr. Luvkush Singrol. The city is divided into 48 wards and each ward is represented by a councillor directly elected by the people from the ward. The mayor of the city is elected indirectly from amongst the councillors.

Civic utilities 
Electricity is supplied by the state's Chhattisgarh State Power Distribution Company Limited. Ambikapur Municipal Corporation supplies 10.6 MLD of water to the city. Drinking water was initially sourced from the Banki Dam, but after pipeline expansion and construction of an automatic filter plant in Katkalo under the AMRUT scheme, in 2020 will also be sourced from the Ghughutta Dam in Nawagarh. The city has a total of 16 tanks for this purpose.

The Municipal Corporation is responsible for the solid waste management of the city. Ambikapur generates 45 metric ton solid waste everyday, 90% of which is segregated through a decentralised waste management model. Household waste is collected door-to-door by 447 SHG women of 48 wards. The city has achieved 100% segregation of waste at the household level. It has no landfills and has been declared a zero-waste city since it converted its 15-acre landfill into a park in 2016. Ambikapur has implemented Solid Liquid Resource Management (SLRM) for disposal of municipal solid waste. There is no sewerage system in the city. Toilets are linked to individual septic tanks.

In the Ambikapur block 74.51% of the total geographical area is cultivated. The Ambikapur Development Plan 2021 (Draft) was created by the Chhattisgarh Directorate of Town and Country Planning.

Transport

Rail
Ambikapur is connected to the Anuppur railway junction, a bordering town in Madhya Pradesh, by a broad gauge railway. Trains reach Ambikapur from Katni, Satna, Jabalpur, Durg, Bhopal and the state capital Raipur. More destinations, such as New Delhi, can be reached from Anuppur railway junction.

Jabalpur - Ambikapur Express, Ambikapur – Shahdol, Ambikapur – Surajpur – Anuppur – Bilaspur – Raipur – Durg Express and Bhopal – Chirmiri Passenger run from major cities Bhopal, Gwalior, Katni, Raipur and Jabalpur.

ABKP-NZM AC Special 

The train from AMBIKAPUR TO HAZRAT NIZAMUDDIN (NEW DELHI).  Route from Ambikapur-Anuppur-Katni-Damoh-Jhansi-Agra-Harzat Nizamuddin

Road 
Ambikapur is well connected by road to other major cities of Chhattisgarh such as Raipur, Bilaspur, Durg, Bhilai, Korba and Raigarh. Daily bus services also runs for Varanasi, Renukoot in U.P (170 km), Raipur (345 km) and Garhwa in Jharkhand (160 km). Bus services from Anuppur to Ambikapur operate via Manendragarh and Surajpur. The bus journeys from Bilaspur and Anuppur take between five and six hours.

Air 
Ambikapur Airport is located at Darima, 12 km (7.5 mi) south of Ambikapur. The air strip is mostly used by small aircraft and helicopters. It is the nearest airport with regular scheduled flights to Raipur, the capital of Chhattisgarh state.

Nearest operational Airport is Bilasa devi kevat airport just 210km from  Ambikapur City.

Education 
 Sarguja University
 Rajmata shrimati Devendra Kumari Singhdeo Medical College

Media and communications
State-owned All India Radio has a local station in Ambikapur.
Sigma media limited

Notable people
T. S. Singh Deo
Sunil Kumar Sinha

Royal Palace

Surguja palace also known as Raghunath Palace is a prime palace in Ambikapur.  It is a white, two-storey palace. Surguja Palace is one of the most eye-catching tourist places for both urban and rural crowds. This palace is open for public only on the day of Dussehra every year. Its an old tradition that the heir of royal family of Surguja meets and greets the visitors on Dussehra and the festival is celebrated in a pompous manner.

See also 
Ambikapur constituency

References

Cities and towns in Surguja district